Tin Shing is one of the 39 constituencies in the Yuen Long District of Hong Kong.

The constituency returns one district councillor to the Yuen Long District Council, with an election every four years. Tin Shing constituency is loosely based on part of Tin Shing Court in Tin Shui Wai with estimated population of 14,278.

History
Tin Shing was established as one of constituencies in 2003. Formerly the constituency include the whole area of Tin Shing Court.

As the constituency population exceeding and the construction of Ping Yan Court was completed in 2018. The constituency boundary was redrawn and Block A, B, C, D and G in Tin Shing Court were excluded in the constituency.

Councillors represented

Election results

2010s

References

Tin Shui Wai
Constituencies of Hong Kong
Constituencies of Yuen Long District Council
2003 establishments in Hong Kong
Constituencies established in 2003